Staring into the Sun is the first studio album by the Milwaukee-based rock band The Gufs.

Track listing
All tracks by The Gufs

"Free Again" - 3:49
"Under Breath" - 4:01
"So Far Away" - 3:22
"Small Town" - 3:55
"You Don't Mind" - 4:46
"Walk Alone" - 3:39
"Staring into the Sun" - 4:41
"Reasons Why" - 4:02
"Work Song" - 2:59
"Fall Back Again" - 2:45
"Gone" - 3:16
"Some Fine Day" - 6:16

Personnel 
 Goran Kralj - lead vocals
 Dejan Kralj - bass guitar
 Morgan Dawley - lead guitar, backup vocals
 Scott Schwebel - drums

External links
The Gufs Official Website

Notes

1990 albums
The Gufs albums